The following is a list of events relating to television in Ireland from 1985.

Events

March – Vincent Finn is appointed Director-General of RTÉ.
25 July – RTÉ 2 picks up the last British sitcom to star Leonard Rossiter, Tripper's Day.
16 November – US action adventure series MacGyver premieres on RTÉ 1, two months after its first television airing in its homeland.
24 December – The Riordans is broadcast for the final time on RTÉ radio. The programme had switched from television to radio in 1979.
Undated – The Late Late Show attracts controversy following an interview with a pair of lesbian former nuns. The edition leads to protesters picketing the studio with hymns and rosary beads after a High Court case during which there are calls for the chat show to be outlawed over fears it will "greatly undermine Christian moral values" and "the respect of the general public for nuns".
Undated – 1985 is believed to be the airdate of Nova TV, a pirate television station in Dublin.
Undated – The popular Irish children's television puppet character Bosco returns to television with a brand new animated 5 minute series. The series features the character living in a house in the country (rather than inside a box like the original live-action series) and introduces new characters such as the three bears, Pat and Paul (two mischievous children who wear mushrooms as hats), Captain Buccaneer the firefighter (who wears a firefighter's bucket as a hat) and the haughty Duchess. Paula Lambert Bosco's current puppeteer reprises her role as Bosco by providing the voice whilst former presenters of the live-action series Marian Richardson and Frank Twomey provided the voices of all the other female and male characters.

Debuts

RTÉ 1
8 January –  Shirt Tales (1982–1983)
1 February –  Benji, Zax & the Alien Prince (1983)
26 June – / Ulysses 31 (1981–1982)
19 July –  Goodbye, Mr. Chips (1984)
28 August –  Ever Decreasing Circles (1984–1989)
26 September –  Alvin and the Chipmunks (Ruby Spears version) (1983–1987)
30 September –  Children's Island (1985)
1 October –  The Wind in the Willows (1983–1990)
4 October –  Casper and the Angels (1979)
16 November –  MacGyver (1985–1992)
2 December –  Super Gran (1985–1987)
Undated – Bosco: The Animated Series (1985)
Undated -  Cover Up (1984-1985)

RTÉ 2
7 January –  Monchhichis (1983)
17 July –  Pitfall! (1983)
25 July –  Tripper's Day (1984)
4 September –  Cockleshell Bay (1980–1986)
19 October –  He-Man and the Masters of the Universe (1983–1985)
Undated –  Dempsey and Makepeace (1985–1986)

Ongoing television programmes

1960s
RTÉ News: Nine O'Clock (1961–present)
RTÉ News: Six One (1962–present)
The Late Late Show (1962–present)

1970s
Sports Stadium (1973–1997)
The Late Late Toy Show (1975–present)
RTÉ News on Two (1978–2014)
Bosco (1979–1996)
The Sunday Game (1979–present)

1980s
Today Tonight (1982–1992)
Mailbag (1982–1996)
Glenroe (1983–2001)
Davis at Large (1984–1986)
Leave It To Mrs O'Brien (1984–1986)
MT-USA (1984–1987)

Ending this year
Undated – Trom agus Éadrom (1975–1985)
Undated – The Irish R.M. (1983–1985)

Births
20 September – George McMahon, actor

See also
1985 in Ireland

References

 
1980s in Irish television